Edward Denis Ryan (December 29, 1925 – October 21, 2002) was an American football defensive end in the National Football League (NFL). He played one season with the Pittsburgh Steelers (1948).  Ryan grew up in Vancouver, British Columbia and attended college at Saint Mary's College of California. In 1948, he was drafted by the Steelers, 73rd overall, becoming one of the first Canadians ever drafted in the NFL. He went on to play nine games that season, his only season in the NFL.

References

1925 births
2002 deaths
Canadian players of American football
American football defensive ends
Pittsburgh Steelers players
Saint Mary's Gaels football players
Gridiron football people from Alberta
People from Banff, Alberta
Sportspeople from Vancouver
Gridiron football people from British Columbia